Jurišić is a Croatian surname. It is derived from the personal name Juraj (George). It may refer to:

 Tomislav Jurisic, karate, box and MMA fighter
 Helen Jurisic, mixed martial artist, World kick boxing Champion
 Nikola Jurišić (c. 1490–1545), nobleman and hero
 Iva Jurišić, women volleyballer
 Zvonko Jurišić, Bosnian Croat politician
 Ilija Jurišić, Bosnian Croat war criminal
 Planinka Jurišić-Atić, Bosnian pianist, piano pedagogue
 Mijo Jurišić, Croatian actor
 Blaž Jurišić, Croatian grammar writer
 Mario Jurišić, Croatian parody rock musician (Vatrogasci)
 Goran Jurišić, Bosnian footballer (Sarajevo)
 Goran Jurišić, footballer (Šibenik, Dinamo, Hajduk)
 Goran Jurišić (historian), historian
 Melita Jurisic, Australian actress 
 Ivo Jurišić, Croatian sports journalist, long-time editor of sports section in Slobodna Dalmacija
 Al Jurisich, American footballer of Croatian descent
 Nada Jurišić, Winners of The Ring with figure of Joakim Vujić, Knjaževsko-srpski teatar
 Slobodan Jurišić, drummer of YU grupa, a former Mama Co Co and Točak Band member, drums
 Pavle Jurišić Šturm (1848–1922), Yugoslavian general
 Ivan Jurišić,  footballer (Red Star)
 Svetozar Jurišić, footballer (Partizan)

See also
Juriša
Đurišić

References 

Croatian surnames
Serbian surnames